The following is the official canvassing of votes by the Congress of the Philippines for the 2022 Philippine presidential and vice presidential election. The canvassing started on May 24, 2022 and ended a day later, making it the fastest congressional canvassing process in Philippine electoral history.

The Congress was mandated to declare a winner 30 days after the elections (June 8) maximum.

Process
After voters had finished voting, the counting machines will then count the votes received by each candidate in each position. For positions elected on a national basis (president, vice president, senators and party-list representatives), the counting machine will then print an election return for that precinct, and will transmit the results to the municipal/city board of canvassers, Congress, Commission on Elections, the citizen's arm authorized by the commission, political parties, and others.

The city or municipality will then tally the votes for all positions and will issue two documents at its conclusion: a statement of votes where the votes obtained by candidates in each precinct in a city/municipality is stated; and a certificate of canvass (COC), a document in electronic and printed form containing the total votes in figures obtained by each candidate in the city or municipality. The city or municipal COC will either be sent electronically to Congress (if the city is an Independent city with its own legislative district) or to the provincial board of canvassers in which the process is repeated; this time the provincial COC will be sent to Congress.

Congress, sitting as the National Board of Canvassers, will canvass the votes to determine who among the candidates are elected president and vice president.

In theory, all of the votes from the election returns when added must be equal to the votes canvassed by Congress coming from the city/provincial COCs.

The provincial/city board of canvassers will send an electronically transmitted COC to the Congress' Consolidation and Canvassing System (CCS) server, which was activated minutes after voting closed on May 9. Meanwhile, the manually counted and physically delivered COCs from the provincial and/or city board of canvassers will be sent first to the Senate then it will be brought to the Batasang Pambansa Complex, the home of the House of Representatives upon the convening of both the Senate and the House of Representatives in a joint session.

The canvassing committee would tabulate the results of each COC in the order they were received electronically in the Consolidation and Canvassing System (CCS) and physically delivered to Congress for manually prepared COCs with no electronic transmission.

The committee would then compare the electronically received COC from the physically delivered COC for any discrepancy. In cases of discrepancies, Congress may summon the chairperson of the provincial/city board of canvassers from where city/province the COC came from. For overseas absentee voting COCs, the board of canvassers could contacted through any forms of communication deemed safe and reliable by the committee. Absentee votes among Philippine citizens who lived overseas would be included by the time the Philippine Congress declared a winner.

After all of the COCs were canvassed, the joint committee would furnish a report to be approved by majority vote by both House and Senate voting separately.

Members of the canvassing committee
Instead of the whole Congress canvassing the votes, a committee comprised evenly between the Senate and the House of Representatives will canvass the votes at the Batasang Pambansa Complex in Quezon City, the home of the House of Representatives. Senate Majority Leader Juan Miguel Zubiri and House Majority Leader Martin Romualdez co-chaired the proceedings instead of Senate President Tito Sotto and House Speaker Lord Allan Velasco.  Senate Majority Floor Leader Zubiri announced the composition of the Senate delegation on May 23, while Speaker Velasco announced theirs on May 24.

Presidential election

Absentee voters

Vice presidential election

Absentee voters

References

2022 Philippine presidential election